Viktor Bogdanovic is a comic book artist best known for his work on DC and Marvel superheroes.

Biography

Bogdanovic was born in Basel, Switzerland (where he attended School of Arts) and moved to Berlin, Germany with his family. He started drawing his own Superman and Spider-Man stories at the age of 12. His first paid work was drawings for a piercing shop. Viktor did a few indie books before he got the chance to work on his first mini-series for Image Comics, which was called Reality Check. His career really took off after his Batman: Arkham Knight run written by Peter Tomasi. Bogdanovic co-created New Super-Man with Gene Luen Yang, and followed that with short stints on Superman with Dan Jurgens and Terrifics with Jeff Lemire.

In 2020, he collaborated with Benjamin Percy on a story for Wolverine #1, which topped the sales charts in February, and was the regular artist on volume 7 before going back to DC.

His style was influenced by Erik Larsen, Greg Capullo and others.

Bogdanovic is of Serbian descent and studied at The Faculty of Philology at the University of Belgrade.

Bibliography

Image  Comics
Reality Check (2013)

DC Comics
Batman: Arkham Knight (2015)
Suicide Squad Most Wanted: Deadshot and Katana (2016)
New Super-Man (2016)
Action Comics (2016)
The Silencer (2018)
The Terrifics (2018)
Detective Comics (2021)

Marvel Comics
Wolverine (2020)

References

Sources

American comics artists
1981 births
Living people
DC Comics people